The following is an incomplete list of stamping mills in the Copper Country of Michigan.

 Ahmeek mill - In Hubbell, Houghton County, Michigan
 Allouez mill
 Atlantic mill - Near the Redridge Steel Dam in Redridge, Michigan  
 Baltic mill - Near the Redridge Steel Dam in Redridge, Michigan
 Calumet and Hecla Mills - In Lake Linden, Houghton County, Michigan
 Carp mill
 Centennial mill
 Central mill - Four miles east of Phoenix, Michigan
 Champion mill - In Freda, Michigan
 Clark mill
 Cliff mill - Clifton, Michigan
 Copper Falls mill - Southwest of Eagle Harbor, Michigan
 Delaware mill - Delaware, Michigan
 Dodgeville mill and pits - Dodgeville, Michigan
 Humboldt mill - In Champion, Michigan.  Planned to be used as a part of the new Eagle mine project
 Huron mill
 Isle Royale mill - Two miles east of Houghton, Michigan
 Mohawk mill - In Gay, Michigan
 Nonesuch mill
 Phoenix mill
 Quincy Mining Company Stamp Mills Historic District - Near Mason, Houghton County, Michigan
 Superior mill - Silver City, Ontonagon County, Michigan
 Tamarack mill - Near Hubbell, Houghton County Michigan
 Trimountain mill - In Beacon Hill, Michigan
 Victoria mill - Located near the Victoria Mine
 Wolverine mill - In Gay, Michigan

See also
 Copper mining in Michigan
 List of Copper Country smelters
 List of Copper Country mines

External links
 Maps of mill locations at Copper Country Explorer: Part 1 Part 2 Part 3

Buildings and structures in Houghton County, Michigan
Copper Country mills
Buildings and structures in Keweenaw County, Michigan
Copper Country mills